The Bartons Arms is a public house in the High Street (part of the A34) in the Newtown area of Aston, Birmingham, England.

Built in 1900-1901 by noted pub architects partnership James and Lister Lea for Mitchells & Butlers, it is a grade II* listed building, and is on the Campaign for Real Ale's National Inventory of Historic Pub Interiors.

History 
The pub is known for its wall-to-wall Minton-Hollins tiles and its snob screens, which allowed middle class drinkers to see working class drinkers in an adjacent bar, but not to be seen by them.  The current public bar was originally divided into three. There are function rooms upstairs, originally for billiards and club use.

It was purchased in 2002 by Oakham Ales who restored the building to its former greatness before reopening it in 2003, after three years out-of-use. As well as serving excellently kept Oakham ales it is also noted for in house provision of Thai food.  On 28 July 2006, the pub was damaged by fire, reportedly caused by an electrical fault. The pub still boasts Dutch gables, Victorian lanterns and central clock tower.

During the 2011 England riots, the pub was looted, windows were smashed, and fires started, albeit quickly doused by the manager, Wichai Thumjaron. Up to eight shots from a 19th Century St Etienne revolver were fired at police who attended the incident. Five men and a teenager were jailed following a police investigation.

Location 
The Barton's Arms is located in High Street, Aston, Birmingham B6 4UP; at the crossroads of Newtown High Street and Park Lane.

The pub is a key feature on the route map for the Birmingham International Marathon.

Notable patrons 
Laurel and Hardy stayed at The Barton Arms in May 1954, while appearing at the adjacent Aston Hippodrome (now demolished, replaced by The Drum Arts Centre), and were photographed serving beer from behind the bar.

Entertainers Marie Lloyd, Enrico Caruso and Charlie Chaplin were also documented to have visited the establishment when performing at the Aston Hippodrome.

Musician Ozzy Osbourne, who grew up in Aston, is also a former patron of the pub.

In popular culture 
The pub features in the 1999 Atom Egoyan Birmingham-set film Felicia's Journey. It also features in the 2006 novel by Ron Dawson, The Last Viking: The Untold Story of the World's Greatest Heist; as the gang of robbers meet in the pub.

Recognition and accolades 
In October 1974 the local TV company, ATV Today, did a feature with presenter Bob Warman on the Bartons Arms and the film (that does not work on all web browsers)  of that is held for posterity by the BFI

In July 2015, The Guardian described The Barton Arms as a "Victorian temple in carved wood, gleaming tile work, stained glass and wrought iron" in a list of Birmingham's Top 10 craft beer pubs.

In January 2015, the Birmingham Mail praised the pub's in-house traditional Thai restaurant in a feature highlighting '17 of the best comfort foods in Birmingham'.

In April 2016, in an interview with The Guardian, screenwriter and film director Steven Knight described the venue as a "Peaky Blinders-era pub" and recommended it as a place to visit.

In October 2018, The Barton Arms was named as one of The Guardian newspaper’s top 50 pubs in the UK. In 2019, it was included in the CAMRA Good Beer Guide 2019.

References

External links

Astonbrook through Astonmanor - Photographs and plans

Grade II* listed pubs in Birmingham
Pubs in Birmingham, West Midlands
1901 establishments in England